Falcogona is a genus of moths of the family Endromidae. It contains only one species, Falcogona gryphea, which is found in Vietnam.

Taxonomy
The genus was previously placed in the subfamily Prismostictinae of the Bombycidae family.

References

Endromidae
Moths described in 2007
Monotypic moth genera